Pyrrhosoma is a genus of damselfly in the family Coenagrionidae. It contains the following species:
Pyrrhosoma elisabethae  – Greek Red Damselfly
Pyrrhosoma latiloba 
Pyrrhosoma nymphula  – Large Red Damselfly
Pyrrhosoma tinctipenne

References

External links
 

Coenagrionidae
Taxa named by Toussaint de Charpentier
Zygoptera genera
Taxonomy articles created by Polbot